Andor Ónody (3 August 1920 – 5 June 1986) was a Hungarian football player who played as a defender at internationally level for Hungary.

Career
He started the football career at Kispest. In 1940 he was signed by Elektromos, where he played until 1942. His next club was the Nagyváradi AC, where he played for two seasons and after a silver medal, he became the champion of Hungary in 1944. Between 1945 and 1948 he was the player of Ferencváros. Here he earned a league silver medal and a bronze medal too. At Fradi, he played 118 games (93 league, 18 international, 7 domestic cups) and 3 goals (in 3 championships). He then played at the Kinizsi Sörgyár, then two years in the second class at Vasas Izzó.

International career
In 1946 he played for Hungary national football team once.

Manager career
Andor Ónody began his coach career at Kinizsi Sörgyár youth team. Later he worked in Székesfehérvár with a county team, then he worked for Lőrinc Fonó, Vörös Meteor, Láng Vasas and Vasas Izzó.

References

 Nagy Béla: Fradisták. Budapest: Sportpropaganda. 1981.
 Dr. Demjén László: A Nagyváradi AC a magyar nemzeti bajnokságban 1941-44 (1989), 172. o.
 Rejtő László – Lukács László – Szepesi György: Felejthetetlen 90 percek. Budapest: Sportkiadó. 1977.
 Várkonyi Sándor: Mi lett velük?: Onódy Andor. Fradi-híradó, (1975. ápr.) 21. o.

External links
 
 Player profile on nela.hu
 Player profile on magyarfutball.hu

1920 births
1986 deaths
Hungarian footballers
Association football defenders
Budapest Honvéd FC players
CA Oradea players
Ferencvárosi TC footballers
Budapesti VSC footballers
Nemzeti Bajnokság I players
Hungary international footballers
Hungarian expatriate footballers
Hungarian expatriate sportspeople in Romania
Expatriate footballers in Romania
Hungarian football managers
Sportspeople from Borsod-Abaúj-Zemplén County